Kim Jong-hyun (1990–2017) was a South Korean singer and member of Shinee.

Kim Jong-hyun may also refer to:
 Kim Jong-hyun (sport shooter) (born 1985), South Korean sport shooter
 Kim Jong-hyun (footballer) (born 1973), South Korean footballer
 Kim Jong-hyeon (born 1995) (formerly JR), a South Korean singer and former member of NU'EST

See also
 Kim Jeong-hyeon (disambiguation)